Shulehabad-e Olya (also Romanized as Shūlehābād-e ‘Olyā and Sholehābād-e ‘Olyā; also known as Shūlehābād-e Bālā and Shūrābād, or simply as Shūlehābād, Shūleh Ābād, and Shūlābād) is a city in Zaz-e Sharqi Rural District, Zaz va Mahru District, Aligudarz County, Lorestan Province, Iran. At the 2006 census, its population was 30, in 5 families.

References 

Towns and villages in Aligudarz County
Cities in Lorestan Province